William Russell, 1st Duke of Bedford KG PC (August 1616 – 7 September 1700) was an English nobleman and politician who sat in the House of Commons from 1640 until 1641 when he inherited his Peerage as 5th Earl of Bedford and removed to the House of Lords. He fought in the Parliamentarian army and later defected to the Royalists during the English Civil War.

Early life, 1616–1640

He was the son of Francis Russell, 4th Earl of Bedford and his wife Catherine, the daughter and coheir of Giles Brydges, 3rd Baron Chandos.

Russell was educated at Magdalen College, Oxford, and then, in 1635 went to Madrid where he hoped to learn Spanish. He returned by July 1637, at which point he concluded a marriage (initially against his father's wishes), to Anne, the sole heir of Robert Carr, 1st Earl of Somerset.

Career during the English Civil War, 1640–1644

Bedford as Parliamentarian, 1640–1642

In April 1640, Russell was elected Member of Parliament (MP) for Tavistock in the Short Parliament. He was re-elected MP for Tavistock in the Long Parliament in November 1640 and sat until 1641. John Pym was the other MP for Tavistock. Russell followed his father's lead and sided with Parliament in its emerging conflict with Charles I which would shortly lead to the English Civil War.

In May 1641, Russell's father died unexpectedly of smallpox and he succeeded him as 5th Earl of Bedford. Although he was only 24 at the time, Parliament gave Bedford considerable responsibilities, naming him a commissioner to treat with the king in 1641 and naming him Lord Lieutenant of Devon and Lord Lieutenant of Somerset in 1642. He was made General of the Horse in the Parliamentary Service on 14 July 1642 and in September he led an expedition in western England against royalist forces under the command of the Marquess of Hertford. Although Bedford's forces outnumbered Hertford's, Bedford's troops were poorly trained and many deserted and, upon his return to London, Bedford was criticised for his performance.

The next month, he joined Robert Devereux, 3rd Earl of Essex and fought with the Parliamentarians in the Battle of Edgehill on 23 October 1642.

Bedford as Royalist, 1643

By the summer of 1643, Bedford had aligned himself with the parliamentary "peace party" headed by Henry Rich, 1st Earl of Holland and John Holles, 2nd Earl of Clare, which advocated a settlement with Charles I. When Essex rejected the peace party's advice, Bedford became one of the "peace lords" who abandoned the Parliamentary cause and joined Charles I at Oxford: the king pardoned Bedford for his previous offence.

Bedford returned to battle, this time on the side of the Royalists, with his participation in the Siege of Gloucester (3 August – 5 September 1643) and the first Battle of Newbury (20 September 1643). On 16 June 1644, the eve of the Second Battle of Newbury, the King's daughter Princess Henrietta was born in Bedford House, Exeter, the Earl's town house in the South-West.

Bedford attempts to return to the Parliamentary side, 1643–44

Although Charles I fully pardoned Bedford, Charles' inner circle remained wary of Bedford and was therefore reluctant to give him anything but minor responsibilities. Disillusioned, Bedford returned to the Parliamentary side in December 1643, claiming that he had only been attempting to negotiate a settlement with the king and had never intended to abandon the Parliamentary cause. Parliament, however, remained wary of a man who had abandoned them and refused to allow Bedford to retake his seat in the House of Lords.

Withdrawal from public life, 1644–1660

At any rate, the increasingly radical course pursued by the army in the mid-1640s alienated Bedford and he withdrew to his estate at Woburn. Although he took the Engagement in 1650, Bedford would not play any significant public role during the English Interregnum.

Career at the Restoration, 1660–1683

At the Restoration of 1660, Bedford resumed his seat in the House of Lords, becoming a leader of the Presbyterian faction. Bedford bore the sceptre at Charles II's coronation in 1661, but he was never close to the king.

In an attempt to win Bedford's support in the run-up to the Third Anglo-Dutch War, Charles II made Bedford Governor of Plymouth in 1671 and, on 29 May 1672, the day after the Battle of Solebay, had him invested as a Knight of the Garter. He held the office of Joint Commissioner for the office of Earl Marshal in 1673. Charles' courtship of Bedford ended shortly thereafter when his overtures to the Dissenters proved fruitless.

Although Bedford attended services in the Established Church, he also kept a Presbyterian chaplain in his household and his wife was arrested in 1675 for attending a conventicle. This made Bedford a natural ally of Anthony Ashley-Cooper, 1st Earl of Shaftesbury in opposition to the Earl of Danby's plans to establish royalist and Anglican dominance. As such, Bedford supported Shaftesbury and the Whigs during the Exclusion Crisis. The king consequently turned against Bedford, and, in 1682, the family borough of Tavistock lost its charter.

Second withdrawal from public life, 1683–1688

In 1683, Bedford's son, William Russell, Lord Russell was implicated in the Rye House Plot and was executed. Following his son's execution, Bedford withdrew from politics.

Career under William and Mary, 1688–1700

Bedford returned to public life at the time of the Glorious Revolution. He again carried the sceptre at the coronation of William and Mary, and was made a member of the Privy Council. He was made Recorder of Cambridge in 1689. He was Lord Lieutenant of Cambridgeshire and Lord Lieutenant of Bedfordshire between 1689 and 1700 and Lord Lieutenant of Middlesex between 1692 and 1700.

He was invested as a Privy Counsellor (P.C.) on 14 February 1689 and created Duke of Bedford and Marquess of Tavistock on 11 May 1694. He was created Baron Howland of Streatham on 13 June 1695, with remainder to his grandson, Wriothesley Russell.

Bedford died on 7 September 1700 at age 84 at Bedford House, London and was buried on 17 September in the 'Bedford Chapel' at St. Michael's Church at Chenies, Buckinghamshire.

Marriage and family
Russell married Anne Carr, daughter of the Earl of Somerset, on 11 July 1637. Her dowry of £12,000 was never paid in full They had children:

Francis Russell, Lord Russell (1638–1678), died unmarried.
William Russell, Lord Russell (1639–1683), married Lady Rachel Wriothesley and had issue.
John Russell, died in infancy.
Lord Edward Russell (1643–30 Jun 1714), married (1668) Frances Williams.
Lord Robert Russell (c. 1645-c. 1703) married (1690) his cousin Letitia Cheek.
Anne Russell (c. 1650–1657), died eating poisonous berries at Woburn
Lord James Russell (c. 1651–22 Jun 1712), married Elizabeth Lloyd and had issue.
George Russell (c. 1652–1692), married Mary Pendleton, and had issue.
Lady Diana Russell (9 Apr 1652–1701), married firstly, Greville Verney, 9th Baron Willoughby de Broke and had issue. She married secondly, William Alington, 3rd Baron Alington of Killard and had issue.
Catharine Russell, died young.
Lady Margaret Russell (31 Aug 1656–c. 1702), married her first cousin, Edward Russell, 1st Earl of Orford.

References

|-

|-

|-

1616 births
1700 deaths
401
William
Knights of the Garter
Lord-Lieutenants of Bedfordshire
Lord-Lieutenants of Cambridgeshire
Lord-Lieutenants of Devon
Lord-Lieutenants of Middlesex
Lord-Lieutenants of Somerset
Members of the Privy Council of England
W
Roundheads
English MPs 1640 (April)
English MPs 1640–1648
People from Woburn, Bedfordshire
Members of the Parliament of England for Tavistock